Saint-Georges-d'Aurac is a commune in the Haute-Loire department in south-central France.

Population

Personalities
The commune was the home of Louis de Cazenave who was, at the time of his death, the oldest surviving French veteran of World War I in France.

See also
Communes of the Haute-Loire department

References

Communes of Haute-Loire